Lisa Campo-Engelstein, Ph.D., is an American bioethicist and fertility/contraceptive researcher. She currently works at the University of Texas Medical Branch as the Harris L. Kempner Chair in the Humanities in Medicine Professor, the Director of the Institute for Bioethics & Health Humanities, and an Associate Professor in Preventive Medicine and Population Health. She has been included in the BBC's list of 100 inspiring and influential women from around the world for 2019.

Life 
She received a B.A. from Middlebury College, with a double major in philosophy and pre-med and a minor in sociology. She then earned a MA and PhD from Michigan State University in philosophy with a focus on bioethics and feminist theory. Afterwards she went on to obtain a postdoctoral fellowship with the Oncofertility Consortium at Northwestern University Feinberg School of Medicine.

Focusing her research in reproductive ethics, sexual ethics, and queer bioethics, she currently has over 50 peer-reviewed papers, more than a dozen book chapters, and is the co-editor of three books in reproductive ethics. She consistently speaks nationally on these topics, with prominent news focusing on her work in male contraceptives.

In 2019 she summarised the issues facing the development and use of a male contraceptive pill. Besides the technical difficulties there are other issues concerning whether a pill might be in line with the values men find important. She believes that after fifty years of waiting researchers should not wait another fifty years before launching a male pill.

Popular book publications 
 Reproductive Ethics – New Challenges and Conversations
 Reproductive Ethics II: New Ideas and Innovations
 Oncofertility: Ethical, Legal, Social, and Medical Perspectives (Cancer Treatment and Research)

References

External links 
 Institute for Bioethics & Health Humanities
 Campo-Engelstein's Research
 Her article on male contraceptives
 2019 Oncofertility Conference: Lisa Campo-Engelstein, PhD (Video)

Living people
Year of birth missing (living people)
Bioethicists
Middlebury College alumni
Michigan State University alumni
BBC 100 Women